The 2018 Individual Speedway Under 21 World Championship was the 42nd edition of the FIM Individual Under-21 World Championship and was staged over three rounds, at Daugavpils, Leszno and Pardubice. Poland's Maksym Drabik was the defending champion having won the title in 2017.

Result
The title was won by Bartosz Smektała, who beat Drabik by two points. Smektała had trailed Drabik heading into the final round, however he scored a 21-point maximum to take the title. Great Britain's Robert Lambert took bronze.

Final series

Classification 
The meeting classification  was according to the points scored during the meeting, with the total points scored by each rider during each meeting credited as World Championship points. The FIM Speedway Under 21 World Champion was the rider who collected most World Championship points at the end of the series. In case of a tie between one or more riders in the final overall classification, a run-off decided the 1st, 2nd and 3rd places. For all other placings, the better-placed rider in the last meeting was the better placed rider.

See also 
 2018 Speedway Grand Prix
 2018 Team Speedway Junior World Championship

References 

 
2018
World Individual Junior